Elena Postică (born 2 September 1954, Lăpușna) is a historian from the Republic of Moldova.

Biography 

Elena Postică was born on 2 September 1954 in Lăpușna, a commune in Hîncești District, Moldova. She is a member of the Commission for the Study of the Communist Dictatorship in Moldova.

Works
 Elena Postică (coordinator and coauthor), Cartea Memoriei. Catalog al victimelor totalitarismului comunist, vol. I, Chișinău, 1999, 465 p.; vol. II, 2001, 463 p.; vol. III, 2003, 465 p.; vol. IV, 2005, 438 p.
 Elena Postică, Rezistenţa antisovietică în Basarabia. 1944-1950, Stiinţa, Chişinău 1997
 Elena Postică (editor), Impactul Trecutului Totalitar Asupra Noilor Democraţii Din Europa Centrală şi de Est: Simpozion Internaţional Sala Albastră a Muzeului Naţional de Istorie a Moldovei, Chişinău, 1-2 Iulie 1999 (The Impact of the Totalitarian past upon the New Democracies ), Chiţinău, Ed. ARC, 1999
 Elena Postică, Războiul informaţional împotriva Republicii Moldova. Cazul diferendului transnistrian, în Tyragetia, 2002, p. 237-250.
 Elena Postică, Deputaţi ai Sfatului Ţării represaţi în 1940, în Cugetul, 1, 1998, p. 92-98.
 Elena Postică, Grupuri de rezistenţă pe teritoriul Basarabiei. Uniunea Democratică a Libertăţii, în Arhivele Totalitarismului, 15-16, 1997, 2-3, p. 66-77.
 Elena Postică, Rezistenţa antisovietică în Basarabia (1944–1950), în Destin Românesc, 1997, 2, p. 99-109.
 Elena Postică, Rezistenţa anticomunistă în Basarabia. Partidul Libertăţii, în Destin Românesc, 1996, 3, p. 89-99.
 Elena Postică, Organizaţii de rezistenţă în Basarabia postbelică (1944–1950), în Revista de Istorie a Moldoevei, 1996, 4, p. 43-55.
 Ion Ţurcanu, Elena Postică, Veronica Boldişăor, Lupta antisovietică şi anticomunistă a grupului lui Filimon Bodiu, în Literatura şi Arta, 1995, 6 iulie
 Elena Postică, "Armata Neagră". Organizaţie patriotică de rezistenţă sau "bandă teroristă antisovietică", Ţara, 1995, 10 ianuarie [= în Destin Românesc, 1996, 4, p. 73-84]
 Elena Postică, "Partidul Libertăţii": reafirmarea ideii naţionale, în Ţara, 1995, 1-5 decembrie
 Elena Postică, "Sabia dreptăţii", în Ţara, 1995, 19, 26 ianuarie
 Elena Postică, "Uniunea Democratică a Libertăţii" în Ţara, 1995, 22 martie
 Elena Postică, Contribuţii la cercetarea activităţii adminis¬traţiei româneşti din Basarabia în primele luni de la Marea Unire, în Anuarul Muzeului Naţional de Istorie a Moldovei, Chişinău, 1992, p. 208-213.

External links 
 
 Memoria neamului
 Preşedintele interimar al Republicii Moldova Mihai Ghimpu a emis un decret prezidenţial privind constituirea Comisiei pentru studierea şi aprecierea regimului comunist totalitar din Republica Moldova.
Moldovan authorities going to condemn communist regime…
Hundreds of thousands of cases to be examined by commission for combating Communism 
 http://www.privesc.eu/?p=1884 - The first press conference of the Commission, Moldpress, January 18, 2010. Video.
 https://web.archive.org/web/20100309165120/http://www.timpul.md/article/2010/01/18/5881 - interview with Gheorghe Cojocaru, president of the Commission.
 Vladimir Tismăneanu, Un moment istoric: Comisia de studiere a comunismului
 Site-ul Parlamentului Republicii Moldova

References

1954 births
Living people
Moldova State University alumni
20th-century Moldovan historians
Members of the Commission for the Study of the Communist Dictatorship in Moldova
Moldovan women writers
Women historians
21st-century Moldovan historians